Allolepidotus is an extinct genus of prehistoric neopterygian ray-finned fish from the Middle Triassic epoch. It is referred to the halecomorph order Panxianichthyiformes.

See also

 Prehistoric fish
 List of prehistoric bony fish

References

Halecomorphi
Triassic bony fish
Prehistoric fish of Europe